Fehérgyarmat is a district in eastern part of Szabolcs-Szatmár-Bereg County. Fehérgyarmat is also the name of the town where the district seat is found. The district is located in the Northern Great Plain Statistical Region. This district is a part of Szatmár historical and geographical region.

Geography 
Fehérgyarmat District borders with Vásárosnamény District and the Ukrainian oblast of Zakarpattia to the north, Romanian county of Satu Mare to the east, Csenger District to the south, Mátészalka District to the west. The number of the inhabited places in Fehérgyarmat District is 50.

Municipalities 
The district has 1 town, 2 large villages and 47 villages.
(ordered by population, as of 1 January 2013)

The bolded municipality is city, italics municipalities are large villages.

Demographics

In 2011, it had a population of 37,259 and the population density was 53/km².

Ethnicity
Besides the Hungarian majority, the main minorities are the Roma (approx. 4,500), Ukrainian, Romanian and German (150).

Total population (2011 census): 37,259
Ethnic groups (2011 census): Identified themselves: 38,367 persons:
Hungarians: 33,254 (86.67%)
Gypsies: 4,578 (11.93%)
Others and indefinable: 535 (1.39%)
Approx. 1,000 persons in Fehérgyarmat District did declare more than one ethnic group at the 2011 census.

Religion
Religious adherence in the county according to 2011 census:

Reformed – 23,258;
Catholic – 4,798 (Roman Catholic – 2,951; Greek Catholic – 1,847);
Evangelical – 327;
Orthodox – 39;
other religions – 994;
Non-religious – 1,935; 
Atheism – 80;
Undeclared – 5,828.

Gallery

See also
List of cities and towns of Hungary

References

External links
 Postal codes of the Fehérgyarmat District

Districts in Szabolcs-Szatmár-Bereg County